Sphingobacterium nematocida is a Gram-negative bacterium from the genus of Sphingobacterium which has been isolated from the tobacco-plant Nicotiana tabacum in Yuxi in China.

References

External links
Type strain of Sphingobacterium nematocida at BacDive -  the Bacterial Diversity Metadatabase	

Sphingobacteriia
Bacteria described in 2012